Ingate can refer to:
Ingate Systems
A device used in molding.